Julien Clinton Sprott (born 16 September 1942) is an emeritus professor of physics at the University of Wisconsin–Madison.

Biography 
Clint Sprott was born on 16 September 1942 in Memphis, Tennessee. He earned his bachelor's degree from MIT in 1964 and his Ph.D. in physics from the University of Wisconsin–Madison in 1969. His professional interests are in experimental plasma physics and chaos theory.

In 1984, the University of Wisconsin–Madison began a program called The Wonders of Physics, which Sprott presented in a typical travelling showman style to audiences of all ages. The show has been presented on the Madison campus over 300 times to a total audience of over 100,000 over a period of 35 years. His shows are available freely as streaming video from his website.

He is author of several fundamental books on chaos, among which Chaos and Time-Series Analysis and Elegant Chaos.

Trivia
 Clifford A. Pickover's website is hosted on Sprott's web server. In fact, Pickover considers Sprott to be one of "today's people" .

External links
 Sprott's Gateway
  Sprott's home page
 The Wonders of Physics - with free streaming video
 The Wonders of Physics videos on Google+.

Living people
 University of Wisconsin–Madison College of Letters and Science alumni
20th-century American physicists
21st-century American physicists
1942 births